William Selden (January 31, 1791 – April 7, 1874) served as Treasurer of the United States between July 22, 1839 and Nov 23, 1850, under the administration of six Presidents.

Selden's Account Book from 1811 to 1833 is held in the Library of Virginia, Personal Papers Collection, Accession number 27812.

According to the Library of Virginia "William Selden was born 31 January 1791 in Henrico County, Virginia, to Miles Selden (1752-1811) and Elizabeth Armistead Selden (1752-1833). He was a member for Henrico County in the House of Delegates from 1813 to 1816 and from 1818 to 1821. He later served as Registrar of the Land Office. He married first Maria Eliza Swann (d. 1834) 26 November 1833, and they had one child. He married second Emily Hunter 9 June 1840, and they had eight children. Selden died 7 April 1874."

References

Treasurers of the United States
1791 births
1874 deaths
19th-century American politicians